LNI may refer to:
 L.N.I., the Ligue nationale d'improvisation, the improvational comedy show
 LNI, the ICAO airline designator for Lion Air
 lni, the ISO 639 code for the Daantanai’ language
 LNI, the Lakota Nation Invitational, an annual multi-sport event tournament